Jeanne-Pernette Schenker-Massot, often referred to simply as Pernette Massot (November 13, 1761 – January 17, 1828), was a Swiss miniaturist, pastellist, and engraver.

Born in Geneva, Schenker-Massot was the elder sister of the painter Firmin Massot, and has traditionally been described as his first teacher. Her own teacher is said to have been Jean-Baptiste Carvelle, a French expatriate in Switzerland. In 1794 she married the miniaturist and engraver Nicolas Schenker, with whom she had two children.

References

1761 births
1828 deaths
18th-century artists from the Republic of Geneva
19th-century Swiss painters
19th-century Swiss women artists
Swiss women painters
Swiss portrait painters
Portrait miniaturists
Pastel artists
Engravers from the Republic of Geneva
Swiss engravers
Women engravers
18th-century engravers
19th-century engravers